Fuat Akbaş (born 1900, date of death unknown) was a Turkish wrestler. He competed in the Greco-Roman lightweight event at the 1924 Summer Olympics.

References

External links
 

1900 births
Year of death missing
Olympic wrestlers of Turkey
Wrestlers at the 1924 Summer Olympics
Turkish male sport wrestlers
Place of birth missing